Katherine Porter (born 1941) is an American artist. 

Katherine or Kate Porter could also refer to: 

Katherine Anne Porter (1890–1980), American novelist
Katie Porter (born 1974), American lawyer and politician
Kate Porter (born 1983), Australian rugby union player

See also
Catherine Porter (born 1965), American singer